The surname Round may refer to: 
 Barry Round (born 1950), Australian footballer (Australian rules football)
 Carina Round (born 1979), British singer-songwriter 
 Charles Gray Round (1797–1867), British politician
 David Round (born 1978), Australian footballer (Australian rules football)
 Derek Round (1935–2012),  New Zealand journalist
 Gerry Round (1939–1969), English rugby league footballer
 H. J. Round (1881–1966), English engineer
 J. Horace Round (1854–1928), English genealogist and historian
 Jack Round (1903–1936), English footballer (association football)
 James Round (1842–1916), English cricketer and politician
 Jeffrey Round, Canadian writer, director and composer
 Nathan Round (born 1980), English cricketer
 Paul Round (born 1963), British rugby league footballer
 Steve Round (born 1970), English football player and coach (association football)
 Thomas Round (1915–2016), English opera singer and actor

See also
Rounds (surname)

English-language surnames